The UFC Hall of Fame is a hall of fame which honors mixed martial artists and MMA personalities, established and maintained by the U.S.-based mixed martial arts promotion Ultimate Fighting Championship (UFC). In addition to the Ultimate Fighting Championship, the UFC Hall of Fame recognizes accomplishments from Pride Fighting Championships, World Extreme Cagefighting and Strikeforce; all of which are former mixed martial arts promotions that have been bought-out by the UFC and its parent corporations.

History
It was officially established on November 21, 2003 at UFC 45 with its home being Las Vegas, and the first inductees being inaugural UFC competitors Royce Gracie and Ken Shamrock.

In 2015, the UFC announced a significant reboot of its Hall of Fame. The Hall was split into four categories, or wings, and a new class of legends would henceforth be inducted every July at a gala event during the UFC's annual International Fight Week in Las Vegas.

The wings are:
 Modern Wing – celebrating champions who made their pro-debuts in the age of the Unified Rules of Mixed Martial Arts, which went into effect at UFC 28, November 28, 2000.
 Pioneers Wing – commemorating the original innovators of MMA, who turned professional before the advent of the Unified Rules.
 Fight Wing – recognizing the greatest, most memorable, and historically important bouts.
 Contributors Wing – recognizing outstanding contributions outside of active competition.
 Forrest Griffin Community Award – recognizing a UFC athlete for their volunteer and charity work and the impact their efforts have on the community.

The new Hall of Fame was a passion project of former UFC executive Anthony Evans, who pitched UFC President Dana White on the four-wing structure several times before finally getting White's permission in 2015.

The UFC Hall of Fame is located in the UFC Performance Institute on the walls of the first and second floor staircase.

Inductees

Pioneers wing

Modern wing

Contributors wing

Fight wing

Forrest Griffin Community Award

References

External links
 Hall of Fame FAQs
 UFC Hall of Fame

Awards established in 2003
Halls of fame in Nevada
Sports halls of fame
Ultimate Fighting Championship